The House on the Hill is the third album by the British art rock band Audience, released in 1971. At about the same time, a single, "Indian Summer", reached number 74 on the Billboard Hot 100;. The North American version of the album on Elektra Records added "Indian Summer" as the opening track, along with "It Brings A Tear" which had already appeared on the UK album Friend's Friend's Friend. The Elektra LP dropped the song "Eye To Eye".

Both the UK and North American LPs were originally issued as gatefold. The UK gatefold contains black-and-white photos of each band member. The Elektra Records gatefold contains the album lyrics with a photo of the "house on the hill" in the background. The Elektra LP was later reissued in the early 1980s, non-gatefold.

The 1991 Virgin Records UK CD release, issued in the U.S. on Caroline Records, used the British LP track listing, adding the single "Indian Summer" to the end of the album. The Elektra Records version of The House On The Hill has never been issued on CD.

Charisma UK and foreign LP track listing
Unless noted, all tracks credited to Howard Werth and Trevor Williams.

Side one
 "Jackdaw" (Werth, Gemmell) - 7:28
 "You're Not Smiling" (Werth, Gemmell) - 5:12
 "I Had a Dream" - 4:17
 "Raviole" (Werth) - 3:38

Side two
 "Nancy" - 4:14
 "Eye to Eye" - 2:30
 "I Put a Spell on You" (Jay Hawkins) - 4:08
 "The House on the Hill" - 7:27

Charisma UK single
 "Indian Summer" (Werth, Williams) - 3:16

Elektra Records U.S./Canada LP track listing

Side one
 "Indian Summer" (Werth, Williams) - 3:14
 "You're Not Smiling" (Werth, Gemmell) - 5:22
 "Jackdaw" (Werth, Gemmell) - 7:20
 "It Brings A Tear" (Werth, Williams) - 2:53 (originally appeared on the UK album Friend's Friend's Friend)
 "Raviole" (Werth) - 3:43 (instrumental)

Side two
 "Nancy" (Werth, Williams) - 4:20
 "I Had a Dream" (Werth, Williams) - 4:20
 "I Put a Spell on You" (Jay Hawkins) - 4:12
 "The House on the Hill" (Werth, Williams) - 7:31

Virgin UK./Blue Plate-Caroline U.S. CD track listing
 "Jackdaw" - 7:28
 "You're Not Smiling" - 5:12
 "I Had a Dream" - 4:17
 "Raviole" (Werth) - 3:38
 "Nancy" - 4:14
 "Eye to Eye" - 2:30
 "I Put a Spell on You" (J. Hawkins) - 4:08
 "The House on the Hill" - 7:27
 "Indian Summer" - 3:16

Personnel
Howard Werth - electric classical guitar, vocals
Keith Gemmell - tenor saxophone, recorder, clarinet, flute
Trevor Williams - bass, vocals
Tony Connor - drums, percussion, vibes, vocals

Additional personnel
Gus Dudgeon — maracas and cowbell
Robert Kirby - string arrangement and conducting for "Raviole"
Members of the LSO - strings on "Raviole"
Gus Dudgeon - producer
Robin Cable - engineer
Hipgnosis - sleeve design

References

Audience (band) albums
Charisma Records albums
Elektra Records albums
Albums with cover art by Hipgnosis
1971 albums
Albums arranged by Robert Kirby
Albums conducted by Robert Kirby
Albums produced by Gus Dudgeon
Virgin Records albums
Caroline Records albums
Albums recorded at Trident Studios